The 1997–98 Slovenian Third League was the sixth season of the Slovenian Third League, the third highest level in the Slovenian football system.

League standings

East

West

See also
1997–98 Slovenian Second League

External links
Football Association of Slovenia 

Slovenian Third League seasons
3
Slovenia